The Honolulu Botanical Gardens are botanical gardens located in Honolulu County, Oahu, Hawaii, and operated under the county's auspices. The gardens are open daily except for Christmas Day and New Year's Day.

The Gardens' stated mission is to plan, develop, grow, curate, maintain, and study documented collections of tropical plants in an aesthetic setting for the purposes of conservation, botany, horticulture, education, and recreation.

The five individual gardens comprising the Honolulu Botanical Gardens are:

Foster Botanical Garden
Ho'omaluhia Botanical Garden
Koko Crater Botanical Garden
Liliʻuokalani Botanical Garden
Wahiawa Botanical Garden

References
Honolulu Botanical Gardens (brochure), Department of Parks and Recreation, City and County of Honolulu, Revision 1/05.

External links
Honolulu Botanical Gardens

 
Botanical gardens in Hawaii
Protected areas of Oahu
Tourist attractions in Honolulu